Auletta is a town and comune in the province of Salerno in the Campania region of south-western Italy.

History

According to a legend retold by historian Giovan Battista Pacichelli, the name of Auletta would stem from Auleto, one of Aeneas' companions. Another suggested origin is olea, the Latin word for "oil", and the town is mentioned as Olibola in 1095 and Olivola in 1131.

Auletta was already fortified around the year 1000, the castle also being built in this period.

Immediately the Unification of Italy, in 1861, the population rose against the Piedmontese Regio Esercito troops. 45 local people were killed in what is remembered as the Massacro di Auletta ("Auletta Massacre"). In 1943 it was bombed by the Allied due to the presence of a battery of German guns.

Geography
The bordering municipalities are Buccino, Caggiano, Corleto Monforte, Pertosa, Petina, Polla, Salvitelle and Sicignano degli Alburni.

See also
Pertosa Caves
Alburni
Cilento
Vallo di Diano

References

External links

Official website 

Cities and towns in Campania
Localities of Cilento